The Consensus 2003 College Basketball All-American team, as determined by aggregating the results of four major All-American teams.  To earn "consensus" status, a player must win honors from a majority of the following teams: the Associated Press, the USBWA, The Sporting News and the National Association of Basketball Coaches.

2003 Consensus All-America team

Individual All-America teams

AP Honorable Mention:

 Mario Austin, Mississippi State
 Marcus Banks, UNLV
 Steve Blake, Maryland
 Brett Blizzard, UNC Wilmington
 Matt Bonner, Florida
 Jermaine Boyette, Weber State
 Gregory Burks, Prairie View A&M
 Torrey Butler, Coastal Carolina
 Matt Carroll, Notre Dame
 Donald Cole, Sam Houston State
 Taylor Coppenrath, Vermont
 Ike Diogu, Arizona State
 Ruben Douglas, New Mexico
 Luis Flores, Manhattan
 Branduinn Fullove, UC Santa Barbara
 Antonio Gates, Kent State
 Willie Green, Detroit
 Jermaine Hall, Wagner
 Jarvis Hayes, Georgia
 Mike Helms, Oakland
 Dahntay Jones, Duke
 Chris Kaman, Central Michigan
 Brandin Knight, Pittsburgh
 Ricky Minard, Morehead State
 James Moore, New Mexico State
 Jameer Nelson, Saint Joseph's
 Emeka Okafor, Connecticut
 Ugonna Onyekwe, Penn
 Kirk Penney, Wisconsin
 Luke Ridnour, Oregon
 Quinton Ross, SMU
 Joe Shipp, California
 Adam Sonn, Belmont
 Blake Stepp, Gonzaga
 Michael Sweetney, Georgetown
 Chris Thomas, Notre Dame
 Luke Walton, Arizona
 Patrick Whearty, Holy Cross
 Troy Wheless, College of Charleston
 Ron Williamson, Howard

References

NCAA Men's Basketball All-Americans
All-Americans